Sugo ng Tondo is a 2000 Philippine action film written and directed by Jose "Kaka" Balagtas. The film stars Joko Diaz as the title role.

Cast
 Joko Diaz as Lt. Rigor dela Cruz
 Patricia Javier as Jenny
 Raymond Bagatsing as Lambert
 Maureen Larrazabal as Jenny
 Rommel Montano as Sgt. Montano
 Ernie Zarate as Col. Roberto Nebres
 Cris Daluz as Mang Dado
 Boy Roque as Fred
 Christian Alvear as Balong
 Jhoana Tan as Lisa
 Masuro Samba as Alden
 Levi Ignacio as Nelson
 Mike Vergel as David

References

External links

2000 films
2000 action films
Filipino-language films
Philippine action films
Viva Films films
Films directed by Jose Balagtas